Neenah is a city in Winnebago County, Wisconsin, in the north central United States. Neenah's population was 27,319 at the 2020 census.

Neenah is bordered by the Town of Neenah. The city is the southwesternmost of the Fox Cities of northeast Wisconsin. It is the smaller of the two principal cities of the Oshkosh-Neenah Metropolitan Statistical Area, which is included in the Appleton-Oshkosh-Neenah Combined Statistical Area. It is sometimes referred to as a twin city with Menasha, with which it shares Doty Island.

History 
Neenah was named by Governor James Duane Doty from the Hoocąk word for "water" or "running water". It was the site of a Ho-Chunk village in the late 18th century. It is Nįįňą in the Hoocąk language.

The government initially designated this area in 1835 as an industrial and agricultural mission to the Menominee Indians of the area. Early settlement by European Americans began a few years later, stimulated in large part by the proximity of the area to the Fox River.

Kimberly-Clark corporation was formed here in 1872. It founded a major paper mill here in 1873, as the region had become a center of lumbering. Profits from lumber stimulated the development of businesses and a variety of professions. Some people relocated to Neenah after the disastrous fire in Oshkosh in 1875.

Geography 
Neenah is located at  (44.174035, −88.468508).

Demographics

2020 census 
As of the census of 2020, the population was 27,319. Ethnically, the population was 4.8% Hispanic or Latino of any race. When grouping both Hispanic and non-Hispanic people together by race, the city was 88.0% White, 2.3% Asian, 1.8% Black or African American, 0.7% Native American, 0.1% Pacific Islander, 1.5% from other races, and 5.8% from two or more races.

According to the American Community Survey estimates for 2016–2020, the median income for a household in the city was $59,778, and the median income for a family was $77,229. Male full-time workers had a median income of $52,352 versus $40,085 for female workers. The per capita income for the city was $33,420. About 8.6% of families and 11.8% of the population were below the poverty line, including 18.7% of those under age 18 and 9.3% of those age 65 or over. Of the population age 25 and over, 94.9% were high school graduates or higher and 32.1% had a bachelor's degree or higher.

2010 census 
As of the census of 2010, there were 25,501 people, 10,694 households, and 6,700 families living in the city. The racial makeup of the city was 93.7% White, 1.3% African American, 0.7% Native American, 1.4% Asian, 1.3% from other races, and 1.5% from two or more races. Hispanic or Latino of any race were 3.8% of the population.

There were 10,694 households, of which 32.2% had children under the age of 18 living with them, 47.6% were married couples living together, 10.5% had a female householder with no husband present, 4.6% had a male householder with no wife present, and 37.3% were non-families. 30.7% of all households were made up of individuals, and 10.7% had someone living alone who was 65 years of age or older. The average household size was 2.36 and the average family size was 2.96.

The median age in the city was 37.1 years. 25% of residents were under the age of 18; 7.8% were between the ages of 18 and 24; 27.6% were from 25 to 44; 27% were from 45 to 64; and 12.7% were 65 years of age or older. The gender makeup of the city was 48.9% male and 51.1% female.

2000 census 
As of the census of 2000, there were 24,507 people, 9,834 households and 6,578 families living in the city. The population density was 2,971.7 people per square mile (1,146.9/km2). There were 10,198 housing units at an average density of 1,236.6 per square mile (477.3/km2). The racial makeup of the city was 96.08% White, 0.34% Black or African American, 0.55% Native American, 0.96% Asian, 0.86% from other races, and 1.20% from two or more races. 2.02% of the population were Hispanic or Latino of any race.

Thirty-five percent of the households had children under the age of 18 living with them, 53.8% were married couples living together, 9.8% had a female householder with no husband present, and 33.1% were non-families. 27.5% of all households were made up of individuals, and 10.1% had someone living alone who was 65 years of age or older. The average household size was 2.47 and the average family size was 3.03.

In the city, the population was spread out, with 27.5% under the age of 18, 7.6% from 18 to 24, 32.0% from 25 to 44, 20.3% from 45 to 64, and 12.5% who were 65 years of age or older. The median age was 35 years. For every 100 females, there were 94.6 males. For every 100 females age 18 and over, there were 91.8 males.

The median income for a household in the city was $45,773, and the median income for a family was $55,329. Males had a median income of $39,140 versus $25,666 for females. The per capita income for the city was $24,280. About 3.3% of families and 5.4% of the population were below the poverty line, including 6.4% of those under age 18 and 7.2% of those age 65 or over.

Transportation 
Interstate 41 runs south to north through the center of the city. Bus service is operated by Valley Transit.

Appleton International Airport provides commercial airline service for the city. Brennand Airport supports general aviation service.

Earlier served by the Chicago & Northwestern, the Soo Line and the Milwaukee Road, Neenah today is on the Canadian National Railway's line from Chicago to International Falls.

Economy 

Neenah hosts significant paper and steel industries. Some paper companies include Clearwater Paper, Essity, Kimberly-Clark and Neenah Paper. Kimberly-Clark was founded in Neenah and maintains significant operations there, though its headquarters moved to Irving, Texas in the 1980s. Manhole covers manufactured at Neenah Foundry can be found throughout the central and southern United States and parts of Europe.

Neenah is the headquarters of Plexus, a developer and manufacturer of electronic products, which also has engineering and manufacturing operations in the city. Also headquartered here are Cobblestone Hotel Group, J. J. Keller & Associates, Miron Construction, Menasha Corporation, Theda Clark Hospital, NM Transfer, and Checker Logistics.

Culture 

Founded in 1959, Neenah's Bergstrom-Mahler Museum has a collection of glass art comprising over 3,000 pieces. It concentrates in historic paperweights and Germanic glasswork.

Notable people 

 Jack Ankerson, NFL player
 William Arnemann, politician
 Havilah Babcock, businessman and a founder of Kimberly Clark
 James R. Barnett, politician
 George Bergstrom, designer of The Pentagon
 Timothy Bishop, Internet Personality, YouTuber, Commentator
 Robert D. Bohn, U.S. Marine Corps major general
 John A. Bryan, U.S. diplomat
 Elmer J. Burr, Medal of Honor recipient
 Merritt L. Campbell, politician
 Charles B. Clark, U.S. Representative and a founder of Kimberly-Clark
 Laura Coenen, basketball all-American, 3-time Olympian – team handball
 Kenneth John Conant, architectural historian, professor at Harvard University
 Samuel A. Cook, U.S. Representative
 Philip Daly, Edmonton, Alberta Alderman
 George Danielson, politician
 Julius H. Dennhardt, politician
 William Draheim, politician
 A. D. Eldridge, politician
 Michael Ellis, politician
 James C. Fritzen, politician
 Robert Frederick Froehlke, businessman and government official
 Jim Hall, professional boxer
 Marcus Lee Hansen, historian and Pulitzer Prize winner, born in Neenah
 William C. Hansen, educator and politician
 Howard Hawks, film director, Rio Bravo, Red River, The Big Sleep
 William Hawks, film producer
 Christopher T. Hill, author and theoretical physicist
 Zuhdi Jasser, medical doctor, activist, policy board member
 Dick Jorgensen, NFL referee, Super Bowl XXIV
 Frank Bateman Keefe, U.S. Representative
 Kris Kelderman, MLS player and assistant coach
 John A. Kimberly, a founder of Kimberly-Clark
 Judith Klusman, politician
 Peter Konz, NFL Player
 Wayne Kreklow, NBA player, head coach of the Missouri Tigers women's volleyball team
 Nels Larson, politician and businessman
 Henry Leavens, politician
 Rich Loiselle, MLB player
 Ernst Mahler, chemist and business leader
 David Martin, politician
 Azel W. Patten, businessman and politician
 Charles H. Pfennig, politician
 Roger Ream, educator
 Reid Ribble, politician
 Nathaniel S. Robinson, physician and politician
 Mike Rohrkaste, politician and businessman
 John Schneller, NFL player
 Richard J. Steffens, politician
 John Stevens, inventor of the roller flour mill
 John Strange, lieutenant governor of Wisconsin
 Kenneth E. Stumpf, Medal of Honor recipient
 Konrad Tuchscherer, professor
 Ryan G. Van Cleave, author and educator
 Edwin Wheeler, politician and jurist
 John Whitlinger, tennis player, born in Neenah
 Tami Whitlinger, WTA player
 Edwin A. Williams, legislator, educator, businessman, mayor

Images

References

External links 

 City of Neenah
 Neenah Public Library Local History Collection at the University of Wisconsin Digital Collections center
 Sanborn fire insurance maps at the Wisconsin Historical Society
 Trade Worries Led Wisconsin Mill Town to Trump. It's Still Uneasy – The New York Times

Cities in Wisconsin
Cities in Winnebago County, Wisconsin
Appleton–Fox Cities metropolitan area